Andreas Per Bartram (born 8 January 1944) is a Danish former footballer, who played as a forward. He made 61 appearances in the Scottish League and Football League for Morton and Crystal Palace, scoring 28 goals. He also played for Danish club Odense BK and for the Denmark National Team.

Playing career
Bartram began his playing career in 1963, at Odense BK, then playing in the Danish 2nd Division. The club were promoted in 1966, but Bartram moved on to Morton where he made 36 appearances over the next two years scoring 20 goals. In August 1969, he signed for Crystal Palace then newly promoted to the top flight for the first time, and made 10 League appearances (two goals) between then and December 1970, when he returned to Morton. In the remainder of that season, he made 15 appearances, scoring six times before moving back to Odense BK in 1971. He remained at Odense until 1977, winning the Danish League Championship that year. Odense were also runners-up in the 1974 Danish Cup and Bartram was named "Man of the Match". At the close of his career in Denmark, he returned to Scotland to play for Bonnyrigg Rose Athletic.

International career
Bartram made one appearance for the Denmark National Team in 1975.

References

External links

1944 births
Living people
Footballers from Odense
Danish men's footballers
Association football forwards
English Football League players
Denmark international footballers
Crystal Palace F.C. players
Greenock Morton F.C. players
Odense Boldklub players
Bonnyrigg Rose Athletic F.C. players
Expatriate footballers in England
Expatriate footballers in Scotland
Danish expatriate sportspeople in England
Danish expatriate sportspeople in Scotland